Brooke E. Knight (born 20 November 1972) is the current manager of the Perth Heat of the Australian Baseball League. He is best known for leading the Perth Heat to back-to-back ABL Championships in 2011 & 2012 (defeating the Bite and the Melbourne Aces respectively).  He is also currently manager and director of baseball operations for the Corvallis Knights, a collegiate summer wood bat baseball team in the West Coast League.

Playing career
A two-sport athlete at Crescent Valley High School, Knight attended Linfield College where he played both baseball and football.  After one year at Linfield he transferred to Oregon State University to play both baseball and football for the Beavers.  Knight signed with Major League Baseball's Milwaukee Brewers organization in 1995 playing for their rookie affiliate, and was traded to the Pittsburgh Pirates in 1996 to the Augusta GreenJackets affiliate.

Coaching career
Knight began his coaching career in earnest in 2008, and as a rookie Manager, led the Corvallis Knights to their first ever West Coast League Championship.  He and the Knights won the championship again in 2011, 2013, 2016, and 2017.

His tenure with the Knights includes directing the team to eight consecutive West Division titles, seven championship appearances (winning four), and four-time West Coast League Coach of the Year honors.

In late 2010 the Perth Heat, of the MLB-funded Australian Baseball League, hired Knight as Manager, where he led them to back-to-back titles for the 2010-11 and 2011-12 seasons.

In July 2019, it was announced Knight would return to manage the Heat, signing a three-year deal.

References

External links

1972 births
Living people
Baseball coaches
Helena Brewers players
Linfield Wildcats baseball players
Linfield Wildcats football players
Oregon State Beavers baseball players
Oregon State Beavers football players